Infernal may refer to:

 Pertaining to Hell

Literature
 Infernal (novel), a 2005 novel by F. Paul Wilson
 The Infernal, a 1997 novel by Kim Wilkins

Music
 Infernal (Danish band), a dance-pop group
 Infernal (Swedish band), a black metal band
 Infernal (Edge of Sanity album), 1997
 Infernal (Nando Reis album) or the title song, 2001
 Infernal (Phideaux album), 2018
 Combo Infernal, Belgian Electronic Noiseband°2023, Soundlab Denderbelle

Video games
 Infernal (video game), a 2007 third-person shooter video game

See also
 Inferno (disambiguation)
 Dictionnaire Infernal, a 19th-century compendium of demonology
 The infernal names, as compiled by Anton LaVey